Arch Colson Chipp Whitehead (born November 6, 1969) is an American novelist. He is the author of eight novels, including his 1999 debut work The Intuitionist; The Underground Railroad (2016), for which he won the 2016 National Book Award for Fiction and the 2017 Pulitzer Prize for Fiction; he won the Pulitzer Prize for Fiction again in 2020 for The Nickel Boys. He has also published two books of non-fiction. In 2002, he received a MacArthur Genius Grant.

Life
Arch Colson Chipp Whitehead was born in New York City on November 6, 1969, and grew up in Manhattan. He is one of four children of successful entrepreneur parents who owned an executive recruiting firm. As a child in Manhattan, Whitehead went by his first name Arch. He later switched to Chipp, before switching to Colson. He attended Trinity School in Manhattan and graduated from Harvard University in 1991. In college, he became friends with poet Kevin Young.

Early in his career, Whitehead lived in Fort Greene, Brooklyn. He lives in Manhattan and also owns a home in Sag Harbor on Long Island. His wife, Julie Barer, is a literary agent. They have two children.

Career 
After graduating from college, Whitehead wrote for The Village Voice. While working at the Voice, he began drafting his first novels.

Whitehead has since produced ten book-length works—eight novels and two non-fiction works, including a meditation on life in Manhattan in the style of E.B. White's famous essay Here Is New York. His books are 1999's The Intuitionist; 2001's John Henry Days; 2003's The Colossus of New York; 2006's Apex Hides the Hurt; 2009's Sag Harbor; 2011's Zone One, a New York Times bestseller; 2016's The Underground Railroad, which earned a National Book Award for Fiction; 2019's The Nickel Boys; and 2021's Harlem Shuffle. Esquire magazine named The Intuitionist the best first novel of the year, and GQ called it one of the "novels of the millennium". Novelist John Updike, reviewing The Intuitionist in The New Yorker, called Whitehead "ambitious", "scintillating", and "strikingly original", adding, "The young African-American writer to watch may well be a thirty-one-year-old Harvard graduate with the vivid name of Colson Whitehead."

Whitehead's The Intuitionist was nominated as the Common Novel at Rochester Institute of Technology (RIT). The Common Novel nomination was part of a long-time tradition at the Institute that included authors like Maya Angelou, Andre Dubus III, William Joseph Kennedy, and Anthony Swofford.

Whitehead's non-fiction, essays, and reviews have appeared in numerous publications, including The New York Times, The New Yorker, Granta, and Harper's.

His non-fiction account of the 2011 World Series of Poker, The Noble Hustle: Poker, Beef Jerky & Death, was published by Doubleday in 2014.

Whitehead has taught at Princeton University, New York University, the University of Houston, Columbia University, Brooklyn College, Hunter College, and Wesleyan University. He has been a Writer-in-Residence at Vassar College, the University of Richmond, and the University of Wyoming.

In the spring of 2015, he joined The New York Times Magazine to write a column on language.

His 2016 novel, The Underground Railroad, was a selection of Oprah's Book Club 2.0, and was chosen by President Barack Obama as one of five books on his summer vacation reading list. In January 2017 it was awarded the Carnegie Medal for Excellence in Fiction at the American Library Association Mid-Winter Conference in Atlanta, GA. Colson was honored with the 2017 Hurston/Wright Award for fiction presented by the Zora Neale Hurston/Richard Wright Foundation. The Underground Railroad won the 2017 Pulitzer Prize for Fiction. Judges of the prize called the novel "a smart melding of realism and allegory that combines the violence of slavery and the drama of escape in a myth that speaks to contemporary America".

Whitehead's seventh novel, The Nickel Boys, was published in July 2019. The novel was inspired by the real-life story of the Dozier School for Boys in Florida, where children convicted of minor offences suffered violent abuse. In conjunction with the publication of The Nickel Boys, Whitehead was featured on the cover of Time magazine for the July 8, 2019, edition, alongside the strap-line "America's Storyteller". The Nickel Boys won the 2020 Pulitzer Prize for Fiction. Judges of the prize called the novel "a spare and devastating exploration of abuse at a reform school in Jim Crow-era Florida that is ultimately a powerful tale of human perseverance, dignity and redemption". It was Whitehead's second win, making him the fourth writer in history to have won the prize twice. In 2022, it was announced that Whitehead will executive produce the upcoming film adaptation of the same name. 

Whitehead's eighth novel, Harlem Shuffle, was conceived and begun before he wrote The Nickel Boys. It is a work of crime fiction set in Harlem during the 1960s. Whitehead spent years writing the novel, and ultimately finished it in "bite-sized chunks" during the months he spent in quarantine during the COVID-19 pandemic in New York City. Harlem Shuffle was published by Doubleday on September 14, 2021.

Honors 

2000 Whiting Award
2002 MacArthur Fellowship
2007 Cullman Center for Writers and Scholars Fellowship
2012 Dos Passos Prize
2013 Guggenheim Fellowship
2018 Harvard Arts Medal
2020 Library of Congress Prize for American Fiction

For The Intuitionist
 Quality Paperback Book Club New Voices Award
 Finalist, Hemingway Foundation/PEN Award

For John Henry Days
Young Lions Fiction Award
Anisfield-Wolf Book Award
Finalist, Pulitzer Prize
Finalist, National Book Critics Circle
Finalist, Los Angeles Times Book Prize

For Apex Hides the Hurt
PEN Oakland/Josephine Miles Literary Award

For Sag Harbor
Finalist, PEN/Faulkner Award for Fiction 
Finalist, Hurston-Wright Legacy Award

For Zone One
Finalist, Hurston-Wright Legacy Award

For The Underground Railroad
National Book Award for Fiction, 2016
Carnegie Medal for Excellence in Fiction, 2017
Pulitzer Prize for Fiction, 2017
Booker Prize, 2017 - Longlist
Arthur C. Clarke Award, 2017
International Dublin Literary Award, 2018 - Longlist

For The Nickel Boys

 Pulitzer Prize for Fiction, 2020
 Orwell Prize for Political Fiction, 2020
 Kirkus Prize for Fiction, 2019

Works

Fiction

 The Intuitionist (1999), 
 John Henry Days (2001), 
 Apex Hides the Hurt (2006), 
 Sag Harbor (2009), 
 Zone One (2011), 
 The Underground Railroad (2016), 
 The Nickel Boys (2019), 
 Harlem Shuffle (2021), 
 Crook Manifesto (2023),

Non-fiction

 The Colossus of New York (2003), 
 The Noble Hustle: Poker, Beef Jerky & Death (2014),

Essays

Short stories 
 (subscription required)

References

Further reading 
 Fain, Kimberly. Colson Whitehead: The Postracial Voice of Contemporary Literature. Rowman & Littlefield, 2015.
 Kelly, Adam. "Freedom to Struggle: The Ironies of Colson Whitehead". Open Library of the Humanities (October 2018).
 Maus, Derek C. Understanding Colson Whitehead, revised and expanded edition. University of South Carolina Press, 2021.

External links 

Profile at The Whiting Foundation
On Point - What's in a Name? (interview, 2006-09-04)

1969 births
Living people
20th-century American male writers
20th-century American novelists
21st-century American male writers
21st-century American novelists
African-American novelists
Afrofuturist writers
American male novelists
Brooklyn College faculty
Harper's Magazine people
Harvard University alumni
Kirkus Prize winners
MacArthur Fellows
Novelists from New Jersey
Novelists from New York (state)
PEN Oakland/Josephine Miles Literary Award winners
PEN/Faulkner Award for Fiction winners
People from Fort Greene, Brooklyn
Postmodern writers
Princeton University faculty
Pulitzer Prize for Fiction winners
Sag Harbor Hills, Azurest, and Ninevah Beach Subdivisions Historic District
Trinity School (New York City) alumni
20th-century African-American writers
21st-century African-American writers
African-American male writers